Park Won-jae (born 28 May 1984 in Pohang) is a South Korean former footballer and an assistant coach, who last played as full back for Jeonbuk Hyundai Motors.

Career
After graduating from Pohang Jecheol Technical High School, he joined Pohang Steelers in 2003. He made 126 appearances and scored 10 goals for K League 2003–2008 season in Pohang Steelers. He was moved to J1 League side Omiya Ardija in 2009. Park scored his first J1 League goal against Urawa Reds in May 2009. Park had appearances in 21 league games.

17 January 2010, He moved to Jeonbuk Hyundai Motors. 27 March 2013, He assisted the opening goal at 2014 FIFA World Cup Qualification, South Korea against Qatar

National team statistics

References

External links

Statistics at guardian.co.uk

1984 births
Living people
South Korean footballers
South Korean expatriate footballers
South Korea international footballers
Pohang Steelers players
Omiya Ardija players
Jeonbuk Hyundai Motors players
K League 1 players
J1 League players
Expatriate footballers in Japan
South Korean expatriate sportspeople in Japan
Sportspeople from North Gyeongsang Province
Association football midfielders